Saint-Casimir is a small village of about 1800 people in the Portneuf Regional County Municipality in the province of Quebec, Canada.

It was founded in 1836 by people who came from Ste-Anne-de-la-Pérade following to the east along the Sainte-Anne.

The name of Saint-Casimir was given in honour of Mr. Casimir Déry, a notary who paid for the construction of the church, which is in the top 10 of the most beautiful churches in the province of Québec. In turn, the church, and the town, is named after Saint Casimir, a patron saint of Poland, Lithuania, and youth.

Two provincial numbered roads go through St-Casimir: Route 354 (east-west - from Ste-Anne de la Pérade to St-Raymond) and Route 363 (south-north - from Deschambault to Lac-aux-Sables). Both roads lead to Autoroute 40, the Montreal-Québec City link on the north shore.

Five rivers run in Saint-Casimir: Sainte-Anne, Niagarette, Petite Niagarette, Blanche and Noire.

Saint-Casimir is also the home to a cavern, the "Trou du Diable" ("Devil's Hole"). It was formed by the former tributary of the Sainte-Anne River, which left behind a stream. Many tourists pass through it every summer.

It is the place where poet Alain Grandbois was born in 1900.

Demographics
Population trend:
 Population in 2011: 1500 (2006 to 2011 population change: -1.8%)
 Population in 2006: 1528
 Population in 2001: 1582
 Population total in 1996: 1783
 Saint-Casimir (municipality): 1347
 Saint-Casimir (parish): 436
 Population in 1991:
 Saint-Casimir (municipality): 1331
 Saint-Casimir (parish): 430

Private dwellings occupied by usual residents: 670 (total dwellings: 736)

Mother tongue:
 English as first language: 0%
 French as first language: 99%
 English and French as first language: 0%
 Other as first language: 1%

Disasters
On the morning of March 23, 1997, five members of the Order of the Solar Temple took their own lives in Saint-Casimir. A small house exploded into flames, leaving behind five charred bodies for the police to pull from the rubble. Three teenagers—13, 14 and 16, the children of one of the couples that died in the fire —- are discovered in a shed behind the house, alive but heavily drugged.

In the summer of 1973, a wave on the Niagarette devastated a small area, where it joins the Sainte-Anne River. A few houses were destroyed by the powerful water wave, due to strong rain, and debris that blocked the small river for a few hours.

See also
 Portneuf Regional Natural Park

References

External links 
Station Météo St-Casimir 
photo-portneuf.com: St-Casimir Photo Gallery 
Cultural Rendez-vous of St-Casimir (french) 
Auberge du Couvent (french) 
Trou du Diable (Devil's Hole) 

Municipalities in Quebec
Incorporated places in Capitale-Nationale